Rigondeaux is a surname, likely of Spanish origin. Notable people with the surname include:

Guillermo Rigondeaux (born 1980), Cuban professional boxer
Máximo Rigondeaux (born 1976), Cuban retired javelin thrower